Rouet may refer to:

People
  (born 1942), French physicist
 Albert Rouet (born 1936), French bishop
 Guillaume Rouet (born 1988), Spanish rugby union player
 Lucienne Rouet (born 1901), French swimmer

Places
 Rouet, Hérault, Occitanie, France